Giurgeni is a commune located on the left bank of the Danube, in Ialomița County, Muntenia, Romania. It is composed of a single village, Giurgeni.

Giurgeni is linked with Vadu Oii–Hârșova over the Danube via the Giurgeni–Vadu Oii Bridge.

The ruins of Orașul de Floci, a lost city of Wallachia, are located near Giurgeni, at the confluence of the Ialomița River and the Danube, on the old riverbed of the Ialomița.

References

External links

Communes in Ialomița County
Localities in Muntenia